The Declaration of Indulgence was Charles II of England's attempt to extend religious liberty to Protestant nonconformists and Roman Catholics in his realms, by suspending the execution of the Penal Laws that punished recusants from the Church of England. Charles issued the Declaration on 15 March 1672.

It was highly controversial and Sir Orlando Bridgeman, son of a bishop, resigned as Lord Keeper of the Great Seal, because he refused to apply the Great Seal to it, regarding it as too generous to Catholics.

In 1673 the Cavalier Parliament compelled Charles to withdraw the declaration and implement, in its place, the first of the Test Acts (1673), which required anyone entering public service in England to deny the Catholic doctrine of transubstantiation and to take Anglican communion. When Charles II's openly Catholic successor James II attempted to issue a similar Declaration of Indulgence, an order for general religious tolerance, it became one of the grievances that led to the Glorious Revolution which ousted him from the throne.

See also

Declaration of Indulgence (1687)
Religion in the United Kingdom

References

English laws
1672 in England
1672 in law
1672 works
Christianity and law in the 17th century
Charles II of England
1672 in Christianity
History of Catholicism in England

it:Dichiarazione di Indulgenza
sv:Declaration of Indulgence